‘Aql (meaning "intellect"), is an Arabic language term used in Islamic philosophy or theology for the intellect or the rational faculty of the soul or mind. It is the normal translation of the Greek term nous. In jurisprudence, it is associated with using reason as a source for sharia "religious law" and has been translated as "dialectical reasoning".

History 
In Islam, the term ‘aql was heavily elucidated by early Shī‘ah thinkers; it came to replace and expand the pre-Islamic concept of ḥilm "serene justice and self-control, dignity" in opposition to the negative notions of ignorance (jahl) and stupidity (safah).

The "possessor of ‘aql", or al-‘āqīl (plural al-‘uqqāl) realises a deep connection with God. Jaʿfar aṣ-Ṣādiq (d. 765, notably an Imām) described this connection as a realisation that God loves some, that God is truth and that only ‘ilm "sacred knowledge" and its development can help humanity fulfil its potential.

His son, Imām Mūsà al-Kāżim (d. 799), expanded this exegesis by defining ‘aql as the "faculty for apprehending the divine, a faculty of metaphysical perception, a light in the heart, through which one can discern and recognize signs from God." He further noted that where the A'immah (Imāms) are the ḥujjatu ż-żāhira "External proof [of God]", ‘aql is the ḥujjatu l-Bāṭina "Secret proof".

While in early Islam, ‘aql was opposed to jahl "ignorance", the expansion of the concept meant it was now opposed to safah "[deliberate] stupidity" and junūn "lack of sense, indulgence". Under the influence of Mu‘tazilī thought, ‘aql came to mean "dialectical reasoning".

Shī‘ī Legal Implementation 
In Shī‘ī jurisprudence, ‘aql is the process of using intellect or logic to deduce law. Legal scholars in both Sunni and Shī‘ī Islamic traditions share Quranic interpretation, the Sunnah, and Ijma‘ "consensus" as sources of Islamic law and judicial decisions (ḥukm). However, Twelvers of the Ja‘farī school of law utilize ‘aql whereas Sunnis use qiyas "analogical reasoning" as the fourth source of law.

Among Twelvers, Akhbārīs (associated with exotericism and traditionalism and theological schools in Qom) and Usulis (associated with esotericism and rationalism and theological schools in Baghdad) were contending subschools: the former reject ijtihād outright; the latter advocate ijtihad and have been predominant for the last 300 years.

In Shī‘ī Islam, "the gates of ijtihād" were never closed and with the use of ‘aql, Shī‘ī mujtahids "practitioner of ijtihād" and faqīhs "legal specialists" are able to respond as issues arise that were not explicitly dealt with in the Qur'an or Sunnah.

Notes

References

External links 
 A Philosophical Discourse by Dr Syedi Yusuf Najmuddin (Translation of Falsafato Faydhil Aql by Syedna Taher Saifuddin)

Islamic jurisprudence
Early Islamic philosophy
Islamic terminology